Research on Social Work Practice is a peer-reviewed academic journal that covers research in the field of social work, including community practice, organizational management, and the evaluation of social policies. The journal's editor-in-chief is Bruce A. Thyer (Florida State University College of Social Work). It was established in 1991 and is currently published by SAGE Publications.

Abstracting and indexing 
Research on Social Work Practice is abstracted and indexed in Scopus and the Social Sciences Citation Index. According to the Journal Citation Reports, its 2017 impact factor is 1.929, ranking it 8 out of 42 journals in the category "Social Work".

References

External links 
 

SAGE Publishing academic journals
English-language journals
Sociology journals
Bimonthly journals
Publications established in 1991